Bonnie's Kids is a 1972 American neo-noir thriller film written and directed by Arthur Marks.

Plot
Sisters Myra and Ellie Thomas live in Glendora, California, with their abusive stepfather, Charley, who was married to their now-deceased mother, Bonnie. When the stepfather tries to rape the younger Myra, Ellie shoots him with a shotgun. Rather than reporting the death to the authorities, the two sisters flee to Los Angeles to live with their only known relative, a wealthy uncle named Ben Siemen. Unbeknown to Ellie, the uncle soon has her involved in a money-laundering operation, but when she uncovers the nefarious scheme, she double-crosses her uncle and absconds with the money. Ellie then directs Myra to meet her in El Paso, Texas, with plans for them to flee the country. A string of unfortunate deaths ensues as the uncle and his hitmen attempt to retrieve the money.

Cast
 Tiffany Bolling as Eleanor "Ellie" Thomas
 Robin Mattson as Myra Thomas
 Steve Sandor as Larry
 Scott Brady as Ben Siemen
 Lenore Stevens as Diana Siemen
 Alex Rocco as Eddy
 Leo Gordon as Charley
 Max Showalter as Frank
 Timothy Brown as Digger
 Luanne Roberts as Paula Clark
 Sharon Gless as Sharon
 Hedgemon Lewis as himself

Music
 Sam Neely - "Blue Time"
 Estelle Silberkleit - "Escape"
 Carson Whitsett - "Got To Be A Way"
 Carson Whitsett - "Someday I'll Understand"

References

External links
 

1973 films
1970s action drama films
1972 crime drama films
1972 films
American neo-noir films
American crime drama films
American exploitation films
1970s exploitation films
Films directed by Arthur Marks
1973 drama films
1970s English-language films
1970s American films